Lincoln Cemetery was founded in November 1877 by the Wesley Union African Methodist Episcopal Zion Church (A.M.E. Zion Church),  and is located at 201 South 30th Street in the Penbrook area of Harrisburg, Pennsylvania.

History

The oldest extant Black cemetery in Harrisburg, Lincoln contains many people re-interred from the approximately five original African-American Burial Grounds in the city of Harrisburg. Members of the Wesley Union church, spread out through the Harrisburg Area, were active in the Underground Railroad. Civil War veterans, including Ephraim Slaughter, the last surviving Civil War Veteran of Harrisburg is buried in the cemetery. He served in the 37th regiment of the U.S. Colored Troops and the 3rd N.C. Colored Infantry. It is the site of one of the historical markers in Dauphin County, Pennsylvania.

Restoration
In July 2021, part of the descendant community of Lincoln Cemetery began clean-up, restoration and reclamation of the grounds.

Notable people
 William H. Day, abolitionist, educator, and newspaper publisher
 Thomas Morris Chester, African-American attorney and Civil War correspondent
 Harriet McClintock Marshall, nicknamed "Ma", assisted with the care and education of the escaped slaves traveling on the Underground Railroad stop located in the old Wesley Church.

See also 
 Mount Zion Cemetery (Kingston, New York)
 St. David African Methodist Episcopal Zion Cemetery

References

African Methodist Episcopal Zion Church
Cemeteries established in the 1870s
Cemeteries in Harrisburg, Pennsylvania
African-American cemeteries in Pennsylvania
1877 establishments in Pennsylvania